Pickerel Lake can refer to
Pickerel Lake (Quetico Provincial Park, Ontario) in Thunder Bay, Ontario
Pickerel Lake (Freeborn County, Minnesota) in Freeborn County, Minnesota
Pickerel Lake Township in Freeborn County, Minnesota
Pickerel Lake (Dakota and Ramsey counties, Minnesota)
Pickerel Lake (Hubbard County, Minnesota) in Hubbard County, Minnesota
Pickerel Lake (South Dakota) in Day County, South Dakota
Pickerel Lake State Park, South Dakota
Numerous lakes in Michigan
Numerous lakes in Ontario